Attribute may refer to:

 Attribute (philosophy), an extrinsic property of an object
 Attribute (research), a characteristic of an object
 Grammatical modifier, in natural languages
 Attribute (computing),  a specification that defines a property of an object, element, or file
 Attribute (role-playing games), a type of statistic for a fictional character

See also
 Attribute clash, a display artefact on some home computers
 Attribute hierarchy method, a cognitively based psychometric procedure
 Attribution (disambiguation)
 Property (disambiguation)